Pavel Voyloshnikov (born 28 December 1878 (Julian calendar)/10 January 1879 (Gregorian calendar), Transbaikal Oblast – 19 November 1938) was a Russian sport shooter who competed in the 1912 Summer Olympics.

He was part of the Russian 30 metre military pistol team, which won the silver medal. As part of the 50 metre military pistol team he finished fourth. He also competed in the 30 metre rapid fire pistol event finishing 24th and in the 50 metre pistol finishing 34th.

References

1879 births
1938 deaths
People from Transbaikal Oblast
Male sport shooters from the Russian Empire
ISSF pistol shooters
Shooters at the 1912 Summer Olympics
Olympic competitors for the Russian Empire
Olympic medalists in shooting
Great Purge victims from Russia
Medalists at the 1912 Summer Olympics